Marie-Paule Cani (born 1965) is a French computer scientist conducting advanced research in the fields of shape modeling and computer animation. She has contributed to over 300 research publications having around 12000 citations.

In 2007, Cani received the national Irène Joliot-Curie Prize to acknowledge her actions in mentoring women in computer science. She wants to strengthen the presence of women in scientific careers and mentors doctoral students. She won the Eurographics Award in  2011 for her work in outstanding technical contributions to the creation of 3D content.

In 1999, Institut Universitaire de France awarded her with junior membership.

In 2019 she is elected at the French Academy of sciences.

Education 
 1987 M.Sc. in computer Science, Ecole Normale Supérieure & University Paris XI, France.
 1990 Ph.D. in computer graphics, University Paris XI, France.
 1995 Habilitation Computer Science, Institut National Polytechnique de Grenoble.

Positions held 
In 2014, Cani became the chair of computer science at the Collège de France.

Since May 2017, Cani has been professor of computer science at Ecole Polytechnique, Paris-Saclay, France. Prior to this, she held the same position at Grenoble INP from 1997 where she was the head of the INRIA research group EVASION, part of Laboratoire Jean Kuntzmann, a joint lab of CNRS and Grenoble Université Alpes. She became a full Professor in 1997. For a period of five years, from 1993 to 1997, she served as an assistant professor at Institut National Polytechnique de Grenoble. She started her academic career in 1990, as a lecturer at Ecole Normale Supérieure, Paris.

References 

1965 births
Living people
French computer scientists
French women computer scientists